The Kalam languages are a small family of languages in the Madang stock of New Guinea.

The languages are:
Kalam–Tai, Kobon.

They are famous for having perhaps the smallest numbers of lexical verbs of any languages in the world, with somewhere in the range of 100 to 120 verbs in the case of Kobon.

It is as yet unclear whether the Gants language is most closely related to the Kalam languages or is one of the Sogeram languages.

References

 
Languages of Papua New Guinea
West Madang languages